The Spoliation Advisory Panel advises the United Kingdom Government on claims for cultural property looted during the Nazi era.  

The Panel is designated by the Secretary of State under Section 3 of the Holocaust (Return of Cultural Objects) Act 2009 to advise on claims made by former owners or their heirs (or in some cases, states or public bodies) for the return of, or compensation for the loss of, items that have come into the effective possession of institutions in the UK, for example artworks in the national collections. It deals with cases where the objects were allegedly lost through seizure or forced sales during the Nazi era, or through looting or other unlawful transactions during the Second World War. It provides non-binding recommendations for return or for ex gratia payments. 

The Panel was established in February 2000 by the Department for Culture, Media and Sport as an advisory non-departmental public body under the Department for Culture, Media and Sport (DCMS). It was chaired by Sir David Hirst until April 2010, when it was reconstituted as a group of expert advisers and Sir Donnell Deeny, a member from the outset, took over as chairman.  Following a Review of the Spoliation Advisory Panel carried out from December 2014 - February 2015 by Sir Paul Jenkins the Government response broadly accepted the Jenkins Review as regards renewing the expert membership and the appointment of two chairs and 27 other recommendations.  The current chairs are Sir Donnell Deeny and Sir Alan Moses.

References

Art crime
Art and cultural repatriation
Looting